was a Japanese linguist who studied the Korean language.
In the 1920s, Ogura made the initial breakthroughs in the decipherment of the hyangga songs, which are now key sources on Old Korean.
Ogura conducted an extensive national survey of Korean dialects. Partly because such surveys have been impossible since the division of Korea in 1945, his dialect classification is still widely used, with some modifications.

Selected works 
  Revised edition, 1940: .
 
 
  Volume 1: . Volume 2: .

References

Further reading 
 
  (first 10 pages)

1882 births
1944 deaths
Linguists of Korean
Linguists from Japan
20th-century linguists